The Yijiangshan Islands are two small islands eight miles from the Dachen Islands, located off the coast of Taizhou, Zhejiang in the East China Sea.

During the First Taiwan Strait crisis the islands were captured in January 1955 by the People's Liberation Army (PLA) from Republic of China (ROC) Nationalist forces in the Battle of Yijiangshan even as the U.S. Seventh Fleet was patrolling nearby.

See also
Chekiang Province, Republic of China

References

Islands of Zhejiang
Taizhou, Zhejiang
Islands of the East China Sea